Brahe (originally Bragde) is the name of two closely related Scanian noble families who were influential in both Danish and Swedish history.

Danish family

The first member of the family using the name Brahe is speculated to have been Verner Braghde from Halland. Better documented is Peder Axelsen Brahe, who appears in late 14th century records.

The Danish branch descended from Axel, and the Swedish branch descended from Thorkild's daughter, .

 Jørgen Thygesen Brahe (1515–1565): holder of a seignory
 Tycho Brahe (1546–1601): nobleman, astronomer, astrologer and alchemist, son of Otte, raised by Jørgen Thygesen
  (1553–1601): holder of a seignory, son of Otte
 Sophia Brahe (1556–1643): horticulturalist, healer, historian and astronomer, daughter of Otte

Swedish family

Johanna Torkildsdotter from the Danish Brahe family, married Magnus Laurentsson in Sweden.
Their son took his mother's family name Brahe, but not her family arms.

Per Brahe was in 1561 granted the title of count by Eric XIV of Sweden, and in 1620 the family was introduced in the House of Nobility as the first counts.

 Per Brahe the Elder (1520–1590): statesman
Erik Brahe (1552–1614): Count of Visingsborg
Gustaf Brahe (1558–1615),  of Sweden – loyal to king Sigismund – and later, Polish general
 Magnus Brahe (1564–1633): Lord High Steward of Sweden
Ebba Brahe (1596–1674): lady-in-waiting and mistress of future King Gustavus Adolphus, wife of Jakob De la Gardie
Abraham Brahe (1569–1630): Swedish Count
Per Brahe the Younger (1602–1680): soldier and statesman
Margareta Brahe (1603–1669): lady-in-waiting for Queen Maria Eleonora and Queen Christina of Sweden, consort of Gustavus Adolphus
Nils Brahe (1604–1632): General in the Swedish army
Nils Brahe (1633–1699): Swedish Count
Erik Brahe (1722–1756): Marshal and Colonel
Magnus Fredrik Brahe (1756–1826): Swedish Count
 Magnus Brahe (1790–1844): statesman and soldier

References

Other sources
Carlsson, Gottfrid Brahe (släkt) Svenskt biografiskt lexikon, bd 5, s. 637-641.
Weibull, Lauritz (1904) Sophia Brahe. Bidrag till den genealogiska forskningen i Danmark (Historical Journal för Skåne Country, s. 38-71)

External links 

 Danmarks Adels Aarbog - Register 1884-2002

 
Danish noble families
Swedish noble families
Danish people of Swedish descent
Swedish-language surnames